Nebo Moskvy, (aka The Moscow Sky and Moscow Skies)  is a 1944 Soviet drama film directed by Yuli Raizman. The film is a Soviet-era wartime film depicting the air defence of Moscow in 1941.

Plot
In September 1941, Lt. Ilya Streltsov (Pyotr Aleynikov), says goodbye to his parents, Streltsov's father (Nikolai Shamin) and mother (Aleksandra Salnikova).

After graduating from a flying school, Streltsov goes to the air regiment consisting of fighter pilots that defend Moscow, the capital of the Soviet Union. The air regiment is under the command of Lt. Col. Balashev (Nikolay Bogolyubov).

Streltsov's love is Zoya Vladimirovna (Nina Mazaeva) who serves as a combat medic in the same unit. He thinks that she is more interested in decorated aces than in a rookie. Capt. Goncharov (Pyotr Sobolevsky), Sr. Lt. Cherbina
(Ivan Kuznetsov) and Sr. Lt. Solovyov (Evgeniy Nemchenko) have already become heroes.

Soon Streltsov proves to be a skilled and brave pilot, and he is convinced that Zoya still loves him.

Cast

 Pyotr Aleynikov as Lt. Ilya Streltsov
 Nikolay Bogolyubov as Lt. Col. Balashev
 Ivan Kuznetsov as 1st Lt. Cherbina
 Nina Mazaeva as Zoya Vladimirovna
 Nikolai Shamin as Ivan Ilich Streltsov
 Aleksandra Salnikova as Streltsov's Mother
 Pyotr Sobolevsky as Capt. Goncharov
 Evgeniy Nemchenko as Sr. Lt. Solovyov
 Evgeniy Grigorev 
 Fyodor Ivanov as Pilot (uncredited)

Production
The aircraft used in Nebo Moskvy are:
 Polikarpov I-153
 Polikarpov I-16
 Mikoyan-Gurevich MiG-3
 Tupolev TB-3
 Junkers Ju 88 (scale model)
 Heinkel He 111 (scale models and static mockup)

Reception
Under the title, The Moscow Sky and Moscow Skies, Nebo Moskvy was released worldwide (with English subtitles). Aviation film historian James H, Farmer in Celluloid Wings: The Impact of Movies on Aviation (1984) described the film's "primitive scenario enhanced by vivid scenes of wartime Russia." Aviation film historian Stephen Pendo in Aviation in the Cinema (1985) had a similar opinion, noting, "... the film mixed a tepid plot about a daring Army <sic> pilot who has an affair with an Army nurse with newsreel footage of aerial combat."

References

Notes

Citations

Bibliography

 Farmer, James H. Celluloid Wings: The Impact of Movies on Aviation. Blue Ridge Summit, Pennsylvania: Tab Books Inc., 1984. .
 Pendo, Stephen. Aviation in the Cinema. Lanham, Maryland: Scarecrow Press, 1985. .

External links
 

1944 films
1940s Russian-language films
Russian aviation films
Mosfilm films
Films about aviators
Soviet black-and-white films
1940s war drama films
Soviet war drama films
1944 drama films
1945 drama films
1945 films
Russian war drama films
Russian black-and-white films
Russian World War II films
Soviet World War II films